Los Nacimientos may refer to:
 Los Nacimientos, Antofagasta de la Sierra, Catamarca, Argentina
 Los Nacimientos, Belén, Catamarca, Argentina